Frédérique Lagarde is a contemporary French pianist.

Biography 
After her training at the Conservatoire de Paris, in 1986, she founded with Philippe Portejoie a duo saxophone -piano which has given hundreds of concerts in the world and was laureate of the Menuhin foundation in 1990 and prize for the best French formation at the Concours international de musique de chambre de Paris in 1992. This duo is dedicatee to numerous works by composers including Pierre-Max Dubois,  and Richard Phillips.

As soloist or in duo, Frédérique Lagarde has participated in various programs of Radio France and recorded numerous discs.

Selected discography 
 Saxophone et Piano (Maurice Ravel, Pierre-Max Dubois, Paule Maurice, Alfred Desenclos, Roger Boutry, Lucie Robert-Diessel, Alain Margoni), duo Portejoie-Lagarde, Collection Musique française du XXe, 1992, Chamade, CHCD 5604
 Dédicaces pour saxophone et piano, duo Portejoie Lagarde, Sylvie Hue, Fusako Kondo, 1996, Pierre Vérany.
 Contre-chant, Musique française du XXe (Francis Poulenc, Jacques Castérède, Roger Boutry, Nicolas Bacri, Pierre Sancan), with clarinettist Sylvie Hue, Le Chant de Linos, 2008, CK 09039
 Carte blanche au compositeur Dominique Probst (Debussy, Kodaly, Poulenc, Kosma, Probst), with Tatiana Probst (soprano), Patricia Nagle (flute), Frédérique Lagarde (piano) and Dominique Probst (percussion), 2008, Fondation Hippocrène.
 Jonction, etc (Timothy Hayward, Roger Boutry, Richard Phillips, Joe Makholm, Lucie Robert-Diessel
 François Rossé, duo Portejoie-Lagarde, Believe/Corelia, 2009, CC874707

References

External links 
 Duo Portejoie - Lagarde
 Biography on Corelia
 Philippe Portejoie & Frederique Lagarde - Sonata For Tenor-Saxophone And Piano, Op. 117. 1.Andante (YouTube)

21st-century French women classical pianists
Living people
Year of birth missing (living people)
Place of birth missing (living people)
20th-century French women classical pianists
Conservatoire de Paris alumni